Trigonopterus disruptus is a species of flightless weevil in the genus Trigonopterus from Indonesia.

Etymology
The specific name is derived from the Latin word disruptus, meaning "broken apart".  It refers to the species' scattered distribution.

Description
Individuals measure 2.40–2.95 mm in length.  The body is slightly oval in shape.  General coloration is black, except for the antennae, which are a light rust-color, and the legs, which are a dark rust-color.

Range

Phylogeny
T. disruptus is part of the T. saltator species group.

References

disruptus
Beetles described in 2014
Beetles of Asia
Insects of Indonesia